Garsende of Béziers (990-1034), was the ruling suo jure Viscount of Béziers and Agde in 994–1034.

References

 Claudie Duhamel-Amado, « Les vicomtes de Béziers et d’Agde : Déploiement lignager et bipolarité du pouvoir », dans Hélène Débax (éditrice), Vicomtes et vicomtés dans l’Occident médiéval, Toulouse, Presses universitaires du Midi, coll. « Tempus », 2008 (ISBN 978-2-8107-0858-1,

11th-century women rulers
10th-century women rulers
Viscounts of Béziers
990 births
1034 deaths